Mani: Travels in the Southern Peloponnese is a travel book by English author Patrick Leigh Fermor, published in 1958. It covers his journey with wife Joan and friend Xan Fielding around the Mani peninsula in southern Greece.

Travel
The book chronicles Leigh Fermor's travels around the Mani peninsula in southern mainland Greece. The region is typically viewed as inhospitable and isolated from much of the remainder of Greece due its harsh geography. The Taygetus mountains run down the middle of the peninsula, limiting most settlements to small villages on or near the coast. They begin near Kalamata, and then proceed south along the Mani coastline (mostly by boat or caique), ending the book in the town of Gytheon.

Leigh Fermor's book almost never mentions his travelling companions, and only rarely delves into first-person experiences. Much of the book concentrates on the history of the Maniots and of their larger place in Greek and European history; the middle portion of the book contains lengthy digressions on art history, icons, religion, and myth in Maniot society.

His future wife Joan accompanied him on the trip and took a number of photographs for the original version of the book.

Reception
Mani is sometimes listed as a companion volume to Leigh Fermor's book Roumeli: Travels in Northern Greece.

Translation
It was translated into Greek by future prime minister Tzannis Tzannetakis while in internal exile imposed by the Greek military junta. The translation was revised after his release with Leigh Fermor who added a further chapter on olives.

Later life
Patrick and Joan Leigh Fermor later settled in the Mani peninsula, living in a house near Kardamyli that the two designed and built.

References

1958 non-fiction books
British travel books
Mani Peninsula
Books about Greece
English non-fiction books